A bodega is a small owner-operated convenience store serving hot and prepared food, often open late hours and typically with ethnic market influences. Most famously located on New York's street corners as an introduction by Puerto Ricans in New York City, they are renowned for their convivial culture and colorful character. There are an estimated 13,000 bodegas across the city.

Etymology 

In  Spanish, bodega is a term for "storeroom" or "wine cellar", or "warehouse", with a similar origin to the words "boutique" and "apothecary"; the precise meaning varies regionally in the Spanish language, and the later New York City term evolved from Puerto Rican and Cuban usage for "small grocery". (In contemporary Cuba, the term now usually connotes a  government ration store.)

In  English, the first appearance of the bodega in print dates to a travelogue of Spain from 1846, describing wine cellars. In New York City,  The Sun reported the first bodega opening in 1902; it was described as a Spanish "barroom", more like a cantina. The more specific meaning of a type of New York City Puerto Rican convenience-store only came about in the mid-20th century, with the first print appearance in Time in 1956; though the term has also been applied retrospectively to such establishments as far back as the 1920s/30s.

In a New York City context, the "bodega" resembles, and may overlap with, a delicatessen, newsstand, corner store, corner grocery store, or candy store.

Culture and economy 
Bodegas were popularized in the mid-twentieth century by Puerto Ricans. Some stores were named after places in Puerto Rico. Although they were initially documented in the 1930s (a 50th anniversary was marked on Spanish-language radio station WADO in 1986), the first bodega may have opened even earlier. Early examples were establishments serving factory workers in Greenpoint, Brooklyn, and La Marqueta in East Harlem, where stalls serving Puerto Rican staples (at first included among goods sold by local Jewish merchants) became increasingly Puerto Rican-owned in the 1920s/30s. Other Latino groups in the city have also embraced the bodega, serving a wider variety of Latin American cuisine. Centro de Estudios Puertorriqueños at CUNY Hunter College owns a collection of historical bodega photography. Despite their Hispanic origins, by the late 2010s approximately half of all bodegas were operated by Yemeni American immigrants. Yemeni business owners led a campaign of bodega closures in February 2017 in protest of the Trump travel ban.

Many bodegas keep late hours or even 24/7 service, contributing to New York City's reputation as The City That Never Sleeps.

Bodegas in popular culture 
One famous bodega, Gem Spa, was a gathering place for beat poets in New York's Greenwich Village in the 1960s. Gem Spa is also thought by some to be the birthplace of the egg cream.

In the 1998 stoner comedy Half Baked, Thurgood, played by Dave Chappelle, refers to purchasing cannabis at bodegas: “You can get the stuff at little corner stores called bodegas. Say it with me - BO-DE-GAS. Yes, very good! These places always have incredibly old products, but the weed ain't bad.”

In 2018, Camden, N.J. rapper  released an EP titled Macaroni Tony featuring a track titled "Bodega" that emphasizes the central role bodegas play in urban communities. When asked about bodega's, Mir Fontane explained: "To me, the bodega always represented a hub for the community… but it also embodies the spirit of the hustle and grind. The owner of the bodega is one of the first true businessmen you meet growing up in the hood."

See also
Bodega, for other uses of the term
Bodega cat
Halal cart
Delicatessen
Asian supermarket
milk bar
Toko (shop)
Botánica

References

Convenience stores
Culture of New York City
Puerto Rican culture in New York City
Arab-American culture in New York City
Supermarkets by culture
Food and drink in New York City
Latin American cuisine